Judah Jah Leone Mintz is an American college basketball player for Syracuse Orange of the Atlantic Coast Conference (ACC).

Early life and high school
Mintz grew up in Fort Washington, Maryland and initially attended Gonzaga College High School. He averaged nine points per game as a sophomore. Mintz averaged 16 points per game during his junior season. He transferred to Oak Hill Academy in Mouth of Wilson, Virginia prior to the start of his senior year. Mintz was named second team All-National Interscholastic Basketball Conference after averaging 16.8 points per game.

Mintz was rated as a four-star recruit. He initially committed to Pittsburgh, but later decommitted from the program. Mintz ultimately signed to play at Syracuse.

College career
Mintz entered his freshman season at Syracuse as a starter at guard.

References

External links
Syracuse Orange bio

2003 births
Living people
American men's basketball players
Basketball players from Maryland
Gonzaga College High School alumni
Oak Hill Academy (Mouth of Wilson, Virginia) alumni
People from Fort Washington, Maryland
Shooting guards
Syracuse Orange men's basketball players